Lianzhou is a town and the seat of Gaocheng District, Shijiazhuang in southwestern Hebei province, China. , it has 47 residential communities under its administration.

See also
List of township-level divisions of Hebei

References

Township-level divisions of Hebei
Gaocheng District